The Eritrean ambassador in Berlin is the official representative of the Government in Asmara to the Government of the Germany.

List of representatives

References 

 
Germany
Eritrea